is a Japanese diplomat who formerly served as Japanese ambassador to the United States.

Career 
Sugiyama passed the official exam for foreign affairs in October 1976, enrolling in law school at Waseda University in March of the following year, but dropping out the next month to join the Ministry of Foreign Affairs. In 1978, he traveled to the United Kingdom to study English for two years at Oxford University.

His career as a diplomat has included a previous tour in Washington as well postings in Nigeria, Egypt and South Korea, along with a prior assignment to Washington from 1989 to 1992, when he was first secretary in the economics section of the Japanese embassy.

In late 2017, he was selected to become Japan's ambassador to the United States. He pledged to work with American officials to resolve issues with North Korea, including the nation's nuclear arsenal and abductions of Japanese citizens. He presented his credentials to President Donald Trump on March 28, 2018.

In 2016, Sugiyama denied the existence of comfort women to a U.N. panel.

As ambassador, he helped negotiate an agricultural trade pact with American officials.

Personal life 
Sugiyama was married for nearly 40 years to Yoko Elizabeth Sugiyama, who died in 2020 of apparent heart failure at their Tokyo home while recovering from a stomach ulcer. She was 66.

Their daughter, Reina, is a fashion designer in New York. Their son, Shunsuke, lives in Japan with his wife and four children.

Sugiyama is Anglican.

References 

People from Aichi Prefecture
Living people
1953 births
Ambassadors of Japan to the United States
Historical negationism